Artyom Sergeyevich Gorlov (born 23 June 1987) is a Russian football coach. He is the manager of FC Pari Nizhny Novgorod.

Career
On 29 January 2019, Gorlov was announced as manager of Lithuanian A Lyga side Palanga, replacing Valdas Trakys. During the season many reports about FK Palanga involvement in match fixing were received by Lithuanian Football Federation while Artyom Gorlov was head coach there. After the season numerous club persons received punishment from Lithuanian football federation for match fixing.

On 31 December 2022, Gorlov was hired by Russian Premier League club FC Pari Nizhny Novgorod.

References

External links
 

1987 births
Footballers from Moscow
Living people
Russian football managers
Russian expatriate football managers
Russian expatriate sportspeople in Lithuania
Expatriate football managers in Lithuania
Russian expatriate sportspeople in Latvia
Expatriate football managers in Latvia
FK Palanga managers
FC Yenisey Krasnoyarsk players
Russian Premier League managers